Embrikilium is a genus of beetles in the family Buprestidae, containing the following species:

 Embrikilium cupriventre Bellamy, 1988
 Embrikilium mirandum Obenberger, 1936
 Embrikilium patricium (Preinguey, 1892)

References

Buprestidae genera